The 2017–18 season was Toluca's first competitive season and first season in the Liga MX Femenil, the top flight of Mexican women's football.

On the Apertura 2017 tournament, Toluca failed to qualify for the playoffs, managing to do so for the Clausura 2018, where they lost at the semifinals against Monterrey.

Squad

Apertura

Clausura

Transfers

In

Out

Coaching staff

Competitions

Overview

Torneo Apertura

League table

Matches

Torneo Apertura

League table

Matches

Playoffs

Semifinals

Statistics

Appearances and goals

|-

|-
! colspan=10 style=background:#dcdcdc | Players that left the club during the season
|-

|}

Goalscorers

Hat-tricks

Own goals

References

Deportivo Toluca F.C. (women) seasons
Mexican football clubs 2017–18 season